Heart North Lancashire & Cumbria (formerly The Bay) was a local radio station owned and operated by Global Radio as part of the Heart network. It broadcast to north Lancashire and south Cumbria from studios in Lancaster.

History

The Bay
The station's original name, The Bay, derived from the sand banks of Morecambe Bay, above which the main 96.9 MHz transmitter is located. Relay transmitters are located near the Lake District towns of Windermere (102.3 MHz) and Kendal (103.2 MHz), near the A684.

The station served a potential audience of around 292,000 people, including the key centres of Barrow-in-Furness, Kendal, Lancaster, Morecambe and Windermere, where the service area overlaps with sister station Smooth Lake District.

Under previous owners, The Bay was nominated for and won several industry awards, including the Station of the Year at the 2010 Arqiva Commercial Radio Awards, and more recently, Arqiva's Breakfast Show of the Year in 2012.

Sale and rebrand
On 20 November 2017, CN Group announced The Bay would be sold to Global along with sister station Lakeland Radio - the sale was finalised by 1 December 2017. Global later announced The Bay would join the Heart network.

The Bay's brand and programming was phased out during February 2018 and following a transition period, the station was relaunched as Heart North Lancashire and Cumbria at 6am on Monday 5 March 2018.

Closure
On 26 February 2019, Global announced the station would be merged with Heart North West. From 3 June 2019, local output will consist of a three-hour regional Drivetime show on weekdays, alongside local news bulletins, traffic updates and advertising.

Heart North Lancashire & Cumbria's studios in Lancaster closed with operations moving to Manchester. Local breakfast and weekend shows were replaced with network programming from London. The station ceased local programming on 31 May 2019.

See also

 Smooth Lake District

References

External links
 Heart North Lancashire & Cumbria
 History of radio in Lancashire
 Kendal transmitter
 Morecambe Bay transmitter
 Windermere transmitter 

Mass media in Cumbria
Radio stations in Lancashire
Barrow-in-Furness
Lancaster, Lancashire
Radio stations established in 1993
1993 establishments in England
Adult contemporary radio stations in the United Kingdom
North Lancashire and Cumbria